Paolo Coccapani (1584–1650) was a Roman Catholic prelate who served as Bishop of Reggio Emilia (1625–1650).

Biography
Paolo Coccapani was born in Ferrare, Italy in 1584. 
On 7 Apr 1625, he was appointed during the papacy of Pope Urban VIII as Bishop of Reggio Emilia. 
On 13 Apr 1625, he was consecrated bishop by Guido Bentivoglio d'Aragona, Cardinal-Priest of Santa Maria del Popolo. 
He served as Bishop of Reggio Emilia until his death on 26 Jun 1650.

While bishop, he was the principal consecrator of Opizio d'Este, Bishop of Modena (1640).

References

External links and additional sources
 (for Chronology of Bishops) 
 (for Chronology of Bishops) 

17th-century Italian Roman Catholic bishops
Bishops appointed by Pope Urban VIII
1584 births
1650 deaths